Valerian Vladimirovich Kuybyshev (– 25 January 1935) was a Russian revolutionary, Red Army officer, and prominent Soviet politician.

Biography

Early years
He joined the Bolshevik faction of the Russian Social Democratic Labour Party in 1904. The following year, he entered the Imperial Military-medical Academy in Saint Petersburg, but was expelled in 1906 for controversial political activities.

Revolutionary career
Between 1906 and 1914 Kuybyshev carried out subversive activities for the Bolsheviks throughout the Russian Empire, for which he was exiled to Narym in Siberia. There—together with Yakov Sverdlov—he set up a local Bolshevik organization. In May 1912 he fled and returned to Omsk, where he was arrested the next month, and imprisoned for a year. He was transferred to Tambov to live independently under police surveillance, but soon fled again, whereafter he spent 1913–14 encouraging civil unrest in the cities of Saint Petersburg, Kharkov, and Vologda. He relocated to  Samara in 1917; and became president of the local soviet—a position he held at the time of the 1917 October Revolution and for the next year. During the Russian Civil War of 1917-1923 he chaired the revolutionary committee of  Samara province and became a political commissar in the  First and  Fourth Red Armies.

Political career
In 1920 Kuybyshev was elected a member of Presidium of the Red International of Trade Unions, which charged him with the implementation of the GOELRO plan. From 6 July 1923 to 5 August 1926 he served as the first economical inspector of the USSR (People's Commissar of the Rabkrin). From 1926 to 1930 he chaired the Supreme Council of the National Economy, from 1930 to 1934 he directed Gosplan, and he served as a full member of the  Politburo from 1934 until his death. As a principal economic advisor to Joseph Stalin, he became one of the most influential members in the  Communist Party. He was awarded the Order of the Red Banner. Kuybyshev was one of the initiators of the first edition of the Great Soviet Encyclopedia and served as a member of its chief editorial board.

Kuybyshev died in Moscow on 25 January 1935 of heart failure at the age of 46.

In accordance with Bolshevik tradition, he was buried outside the Kremlin walls. On the contrary, according to Stephen Kotkin's book Stalin, Waiting for Hitler, Kuybyshev was cremated, and the urn with his ashes was interred in the Kremlin Wall Necropolis.

Personal life
Kuybyshev married several times, but never had any children. He was a gifted musician and a poet. His third wife, Galina Aleksandrovna Troyanovskaya, was the niece of Yevgenia Bosch.

Commemoration

The city of Samara (the administrative city of the Samara Oblast, Russia), the town of Bolgar (in the Republic of Tatarstan, Russia), and the village of Haghartsin, Armenia were all renamed Kuybyshev during the period between 1935 and 1991. The towns of Kuybyshev in Novosibirsk Oblast, Russia, and Kuybyshev, Armenia, still have his name. There is a statue of him in the Kuybyshev Square in Samara and in Dushanbe, Tajikistan.

References

External links

 Biography 
 page 
 page 
 page 
 

1888 births
1935 deaths
Politicians from Omsk
People from Akmolinsk Oblast (Russian Empire)
Old Bolsheviks
Politburo of the Central Committee of the Communist Party of the Soviet Union members
People's commissars and ministers of the Soviet Union
Russian Constituent Assembly members
Recipients of the Order of the Red Banner
Burials at the Kremlin Wall Necropolis